Harriet Craig is a 1950 American drama film starring Joan Crawford. The screenplay by Anne Froelick and James Gunn was based upon the Pulitzer Prize-winning 1925 play Craig's Wife, by George Kelly.  The film was directed by Vincent Sherman, produced by William Dozier, and distributed by Columbia Pictures. Harriet Craig is the second of three cinematic collaborations between Sherman and Crawford, the others being The Damned Don't Cry (1950) and Goodbye, My Fancy (1951).

Plot
Harriet Craig (Crawford) is a neurotic, manipulative, and controlling perfectionist.  She is obsessed with maintaining her ideal of perfection in the appearance of her home, her social life, and herself.  She seems to believe that those around her exist only to fulfill her ideal life.  Achieving this goal makes life miserable for everyone around her.  Harriet shares her home with her loving husband Walter (Wendell Corey), her orphaned and grateful cousin Clare (K. T. Stevens), and two maids—one of whom has worked at the house since Walter was a child.  Harriet and Walter do not have any children as Harriet has told Walter that she is unable to conceive.  Before marrying Walter and becoming the "lady" of his family's home, Harriet had a difficult life which included a philandering father.  This caused her to be hateful and distrustful of men.

Harriet is rude to the two maids and bullies the nervous one, eventually firing her and driving the other, the one who has been with Walter all his life, to quit.  She keeps Walter's friends away from the home, including his best friend Billy Birkmire (Allyn Joslyn), and instead invites over stodgier, older couples whom she feels are more suited to her attitudes.  When Clare falls in love with Walter's co-worker, Wes Miller (William Bishop), Harriet puts an end to the romance with lies. When it appears Walter will receive a coveted work assignment that will require him to travel abroad without her, she sabotages the plans with a treacherous lie to his boss.

Eventually, everyone learns the truth about Harriet.  Clare overhears Harriet admitting to Walter that she lied to sabotage Clare's relationship. As a result, Clare packs and leaves, as she would rather survive alone in the world than live with manipulative Harriet.  Walter deduces that it was Harriet who convinced his boss to cancel his work assignment.  As a reaction to this, and to the realization of what his life with Harriet has become, he symbolically throws off her control; he drinks straight liquor, makes himself comfortable on the pristine sofa and, when she refuses to come downstairs to discuss their situation, he intentionally smashes Harriet's most beloved household possession—a priceless Ming vase that symbolizes her control and obsession with perfection.  When Harriet finally admits to Walter that she lied about the long-term maid, lied to his boss, and has lied to him throughout their marriage about her inability to have children, he walks out, leaving Harriet alone with her one true love and the only thing that she can truly control—the house.

The supporting cast includes prolific character actress Ellen Corby as a bullied maid. Corby later became widely known as Esther "Grandma" Walton on the popular TV series The Waltons for seven seasons beginning in 1972.

Cast
 Joan Crawford as Harriet Craig 
 Wendell Corey as Walter Craig
 Lucile Watson as Celia Fenwick
 Allyn Joslyn as Billy Birkmire
 William Bishop as Wes Miller
 K.T. Stevens as Clare Raymond
 Viola Roache as Mrs. Harold
 Raymond Greenleaf as Henry Fenwick
 Ellen Corby as Lottie

Production notes
The film was based on the 1925 play Craig's Wife by George Kelly. Two previous film versions were both entitled Craig's Wife, the first a 1928 silent film directed by William C. DeMille (Cecil B. DeMille's brother), and the second a 1936 film directed by Dorothy Arzner and starring Rosalind Russell.

Reception
Variety commented: "Joan Crawford does a prime job of putting over the selfish title-character." Otis Guernsey of the New York Herald Tribune wrote: "[Crawford] remains, as always, a stylish performer in her clear and forceful characterization."

Home media
The film has been released on VHS home video. As of November 2012, it was available on Region 1 DVD through the TCM Vault Collection and Region 2 DVD (Japan, Europe, South Africa, and the Middle East, including Egypt).

References

External links
 
 
 
Review of Harriet Craig  (1950) at TVGuide.com

1950 films
1950 drama films
American drama films
American black-and-white films
Columbia Pictures films
Films scored by George Duning
American films based on plays
Films directed by Vincent Sherman
Films produced by William Dozier
Film noir
1950s English-language films
1950s American films